James E. Keegan (born November 3, 1969) is an American drummer and voice actor. He has played with artists such as Santana, as the drummer on the song "Primavera" on Santana's hit album Supernatural and with John Waite. He was the drummer for the progressive rock band Spock's Beard, having replaced original drummer Nick D'Virgilio in November 2011. Before joining Spock's Beard, Keegan was their touring drummer since 2003, when D'Virgilio picked up the frontman and main singer role during live performances. Keegan was a member of Spock's Beard for five years, until he left in October 2016. Keegan is now the drummer of the progressive rock band Pattern-Seeking Animals.

Acting/Voiceover career 
According to an interview with Keegan, he did acting and voiceover work as a child. His credits included G.I. Joe, The Littles,  and Over The Top. While Keegan voiced various characters on G.I. Joe, his primary character on The Littles was Henry Bigg. Keegan said "the voice-over work is probably the most fun because I'm a huge cartoon fan." He also had a very brief appearance on the long running CBS daytime drama The Young and the Restless in 1983 as Phillip Chancellor III.

Equipment 
Keegan endorses Yamaha Drums. He also uses Aquarian Drumheads, Vater drumsticks, Sabian cymbals, Focusrite Audio and Audio Technica microphones.

References

External links 
Keegan's homepage
Interview with Keegan
 
Pattern-Seeking Animals website
Spock's Beard website

1969 births
Living people
American rock drummers
Spock's Beard members
20th-century American drummers
American male drummers
American male voice actors
20th-century American male musicians